The 2001 Skate America was the first event of six in the 2001–02 ISU Grand Prix of Figure Skating, a senior-level international invitational competition series. It was held at the World Arena in Colorado Springs, Colorado on October 24–28. Medals were awarded in the disciplines of men's singles, ladies' singles, pair skating, and ice dancing. Skaters earned points toward qualifying for the 2001–02 Grand Prix Final.

Results

Men

Ladies

Pairs

Ice dancing

External links
 2001 Smart Ones Skate America
 ISU report Preview
 ISU report Day 1
 ISU report Day 2
 ISU report Day 3

Skate America, 2001
Skate America